NCAA Season 85 is the 2009–10 season of the National Collegiate Athletic Association of the Philippines. The host for this year will be San Beda College (SBC).

The season began on June 27 at the Araneta Coliseum with United States Ambassador to the Philippines Kristie Kenney delivered the keynote speech, followed by a tripleheader of seniors' basketball games. The juniors' basketball tournament tips off at the San Juan Gym with the remaining first round of eliminations games in basketball will be held at the Filoil Flying V Arena. Other sporting events will be held at Philippine Sports Commission venues such as the Rizal Memorial Sports Complex.

New member
With the Philippine Christian University (PCU) taking an indefinite leave of absence after the revelation of identity switching on their juniors' basketball team, the league began accepting candidates to take over PCU's spot. Emilio Aguinaldo College (EAC), Centro Escolar University (CEU), Angeles University Foundation (AUF), Arellano University and Lyceum of the Philippines University were the top candidates to join the league; other schools that were considered are Technological University of the Philippines and Don Bosco Technical College (a member of the NCAA South). Seeking to name a replacement before the year ends, the new school must have a high school varsity program, participate in all NCAA sports, undergo a three-year probationary period, and pay a PHP5 million membership fee.

Aside from assuring itself an 8-team roster for 2009, the league also envisions on having a 10-team league by 2010. PCU may still apply for membership but they will have to go through the same process as the other new applicants. League chairman for 2008-09 Ding Lozano of the Mapua Institute of Technology mentioned that Lyceum and EAC were the top contenders to be accepted in 2008.

On January 2, 2009, it was revealed that the choices were pared down to Lyceum, EAC and Arellano. However, after a month of delay, the policy board failed to garner a minimum number of votes to admit a new member; thus for this season, there will only be seven schools participating, while the schools that were considered will still be in contention for next season.

Prior to the Holy Week break, NCAA president Fr. Mat de Jesus, OSB announced that three schools were invited to compete as "guest teams" for the 2009–10 season, although he didn't mention the identities of the invited schools. Those that will accept invitations will still apply for full membership for the 2010–11 season. On April 21, newspapers announced that the three schools invited were Angeles University Foundation, Arellano University and Emilio Aguinaldo College. Lyceum's chances were said to be hurt with an absence of a high school varsity program. All three teams signified their intentions to participate as guest teams, paying the league 1.5 million pesos, plus a 500,000 peso-bond.

The Management Committee also decided that guest teams are eligible to win championships in the events they will participate at, and that their performance will be a part of their acceptance as full members.

Demonstration sports
Olympic sports amateur boxing, archery and fencing will be contested as demonstration sports in the 2009–10 season. Boxing will be implemented with the help of the Amateur Boxing Association of the Philippines, with its secretary-general Patrick Gregorio saying that it is a welcome development.

Basketball

Seniors' tournament

Elimination round

Bracket

Awardees
Most Valuable Player: John Wilson (JRU)
Rookie of the Year: Sudan Daniel (San Beda)

Juniors' tournament

Elimination round

Bracket

Awardees
Most Valuable Player: Louie Vigil (JRU)
Rookie of the Year: Baser Amer (San Beda)

Volleyball

The volleyball tournaments commence on August 16, 2009 at the Ninoy Aquino Stadium. Subsequent games will then be held at the Emilio Aguinaldo College gym.

The old split-season format (winners of the first and second half of the season faced off in the best-of-3 finals) would not be used. Instead, the tournament will be a single round robin, with the top four advancing to another round robin semifinals, with best two teams going to the best-of-3 finals.

Men's tournament

Elimination round
Season host is boldfaced. Guest teams are italicized.

Semifinals

Finals

|-
!colspan=10|Letran wins series 2–1
|}

Women's tournament

Elimination round
Season host is boldfaced. Guest teams are italicized.

Semifinals

Finals

|-
!colspan=10|San Sebastian wins series 2–1
|}

Juniors' tournament

Elimination round
Season host is boldfaced. Guest teams are italicized.

Semifinals

Finals

|-
!colspan=10|UPHSD wins series 2–0
|}

Chess

The chess tournaments are held at SM City Manila starting on July 25, 2008.

Seniors' tournament

Elimination round
Season host is boldfaced. Guest teams are italicized.

Bracket
Games with asterisks (*) to be played if necessary.

Awards
Most Valuable Player: Chester Brian Guerrero (Letran)
Coach of the Year: Roland Perez (Letran)

Juniors' tournament
Elimination round
Season host is boldfaced. Guest teams are italicized.

BracketGames with asterisks (*) to be played if necessary.

Awards
Most Valuable Player: Aldous Roy Coronel (San Sebastian)
Coach of the Year: Homer Cunanan (San Sebastian)

Swimming
The swimming championships were held at Trace Aquatics Center Los Baños, Laguna starting from August 18. A women's tournament, a demonstration event, was also held. The results are:

Men's tournament

Most Valuable Swimmer: Theody Gavino (San Beda)
Coach of the Year: Gavino Roxas (San Beda)

Juniors' tournament

Most Valuable Swimmer: Luis Angelo Enriquez (LSGH)
Coach of the Year: Gregory Colmenares (LSGH)

Women's tournament
Women's swimming is a demonstration sport and is not counted on the General Championship.

Football
The football tournaments are divided into three stages: A round robin elimination where the top four teams advance to the a round robin semifinals, and the finals where the top seed has the twice to beat advantage.

Seniors' tournament

Elimination round

Semifinals

Finals

Juniors' tournament

Elimination round

Semifinals

Finals

Cheerleading
The NCAA Cheerdance Competition was held on October 21, 2009 at the Filoil Flying V Arena. The affair was covered live by Studio 23 and was hosted by Drei Felix and the various NCAA courtside reporters.

General Championship race
Season host is boldfaced.

Juniors' Division

Seniors' Division

See also
UAAP Season 72

References

External links
NCAA official website

2009 in Philippine sport
2009 in multi-sport events
85
2010 in multi-sport events
2010 in Philippine sport